The tenth season of Married at First Sight premiered on 30 January 2023 on the Nine Network. Relationship experts John Aiken and Mel Schilling, alongside sexologist Alessandra Rampolla all return to match 10 brides and 10 grooms together. Halfway through the experiment, the experts matched another 2 brides and 2 grooms together.

Couple Profiles

Commitment Ceremony History

  This couple left the experiment outside of commitment ceremony.
  This couple elected to leave the experiment during the commitment ceremony.

Marriage swap week

Ratings

References

10
2023 Australian television seasons
Television shows filmed in Australia